20 mm caliber is a specific size of popular autocannon ammunition. It is typically used to distinguish smaller-caliber weapons, commonly called "guns", from larger-caliber "cannons" (e.g. machine gun vs. autocannon).

Weapons using this caliber range from anti-materiel rifles and anti-tank rifles to aircraft autocannons and anti-aircraft guns.

Usage

Twenty-millimeter-caliber weapons are generally not used to target individual soldiers, but have targets such as vehicles, buildings, or aircraft.

Types of ammunition
High explosive (HE)
High explosive incendiary (HEI)
Armor-piercing (AP)
Semi-armor-piercing high explosive incendiary (SAPHEI)
Armor-piercing discarding sabot (APDS)
High explosive fragmentation tracer (HEF-T)
High explosive high capacity (HE-M)
Penetrator with enhanced lateral effect (PELE)
Target practice - inert projectile (i.e., PGU-27A/B) Used for training (TP)
Target practice tracer - inert projectile with tracer material in base for visual trajectory tracking (i.e., PGU-30A/B) (TP-T)

20 mm weapons
Each weapon is listed with its cartridge type appended.

Current weapons

Historical weapons

Naming conventions 
The usual nomenclature of ammunition indicates the diameter of projectile and the length of the cartridge that holds it; for example, 20×102 mm is a 20 mm projectile in a 102 mm long case.

Though this designation is often assumed to be unique, this is not always the case, e.g. there are three different 20×110 mm types which are not compatible. These may be distinguished in that some cartridge designations may include additional letters or names as a suffix, e.g. the various different types of 20×110 mm might be distinguished as 20×110 mm Hispano, 20×110 mm RB and 20×110 mm USN.

Common suffixes 
 B e.g. 20×138B: the cartridge has a belt which is used for headspacing, i.e. it helps ensure the correct positioning within the gun's chamber.
 R e.g. 20×145R: a rimmed cartridge: the diameter of the rim forming the base is larger than that of the cartridge case itself.
 RB e.g. Oerlikon 20×110RB: rebated rim, one where the rim is a smaller diameter than the case head allowing the extractor to follow it into the chamber, facilitating advanced-primer ignition, a recoil-moderating system.

See also

 .50 BMG
 .950 JDJ
 14.5×114 mm
 20×110mm USN
 23 mm caliber
 23×115 mm
 23×152 mm
 25 mm caliber
 30 mm caliber

References

External links
FAS: 20 mm Cannon Ammunition
ATK produced 20, 25 & 30 mm caliber ammunition
Rapid Fire: 20 mm Cartridge Data Table
Rapid Fire: 20 mm Antitank Rifle Cartridges image
Rapid Fire: 20 mm Autocannon Cartridges WWII image 1
Rapid Fire: 20 mm Autocannon Cartridges WWII image 2
Rapid Fire: 20 mm Autocannon Cartridges Post-WWII image

20mm sniper rifles
Large-caliber cartridges